The Malaysia men's national basketball team represents Malaysia at international basketball competitions. It is organized and run by the Malaysia Basketball Association (MABA). (Malay: Persatuan Bola Keranjang Malaysia)

The team had its prime time between 1960 and 1995 when it qualified for the FIBA Asia Championship, Asia's most prestigious basketball tournament, 18 times in a row. In 1986 it qualified for the World Cup, its most noteworthy accomplishment to date.

Petronas is the major sponsor for MABA. The women's national team has more successes internationally compared to the men's counterpart.

Outlook
In Malaysia, the sport is predominantly played by people with Chinese background, hence the majority of the national team players have Chinese names. Efforts have been made to attract other ethnicities and popularise the sport in Malaysia.

Kit

Manufacturer
2015–present: Li-Ning

Performance  history

Summer Olympics
yet to qualify

World Championship

FIBA Asia Cup

Asian Games

1951-54 : Did Not Qualify
1958 : 10th
1962 : 9th
1966 : 8th
1970 : 9th
1974 : Did Not Qualify
1978 : 7th
1982 : 7th
1986 : 5th
1990-2018 : Did Not Qualify
2022 : To Be Determined

SEABA Championship

1994 : 
1996 : ?
1998 : 
2001 : 5th
2003 : 
2005 : 
2007 : 
2009 : 
2011 : 
2013 : 
2015 : 
2017 : 4th

SEA Games

1977 : 
1979 : 
1981 : 
1983 : 
1985 : 
1987 : 
1989 : 
1991 : 
1993 : ?
1995 : 
1997 : 
1999 : ?
2001 : 
2003 : 
2007 : 
2011 : 4th
2013 : 4th
2015 : 5th
2017 : 4th
2019 : 6th
2021 : 5th

Commonwealth Games

never participated

Team

Current roster
The following twelve players were named to the roster for the 2025 FIBA Asia Cup Pre-qualifiers.

Past rosters

2017 SEABA Championship

This was the final roster of the Malaysian national team for the recent 2017 SEABA Championship.

2017 Southeast Asian Games

2019 Southeast Asian Games

Head coaches
 Thomas Wisman (1985-1986)
 Brian Lester (1995-1996)
 Brian Lester (2003-2006)
 Sim Sin Heng (2007–08)
 Goh Cheng Huat (2009–11)
 Teh Choon Yean (2013–14)
 Paul Advincula (2013–16)
 Goh Cheng Huat (2016–17)
 Brian Lester (2018–2019)
 Teng Chong Siew (2020–2022)
 Jeff Viernes (2022–)

Kit

Manufacturer
2020: Molten Corporation

See also 
 Malaysia national under-19 basketball team
 Malaysia national under-17 basketball team
 Malaysia women's national basketball team
 Malaysia Pro League

References

External links

FIBA profile
Asia-Basket – Malaysia
Archived records of Malaysia team participations

Videos
 Wow! Half Court-Buzzer Beater Ends Japan v Malaysia - 2015 FIBA Asia Championship YouTube

Basketball teams in Malaysia
National sports teams of Malaysia
Men's national basketball teams
1957 establishments in Malaya